The David H. Koch Theater is a theater for ballet, modern and other forms of dance, part of the Lincoln Center, at the intersection of Columbus Avenue and 63rd Street in the Lincoln Square neighborhood of Manhattan in New York City. Originally named the New York State Theater, the venue has been home to the New York City Ballet since its opening in 1964, the secondary venue for the American Ballet Theatre in the fall, and served as home to the New York City Opera from 1964 to 2011. The theater occupies the south side of the main plaza of Lincoln Center, opposite David Geffen Hall.

History

The New York State Theater was built with funds from the State of New York as part of New York State's cultural participation in the 1964–1965 World's Fair.  The theater was designed by architects Philip Johnson and John Burgee, opened on April 23, 1964.  After the Fair, the State transferred ownership of the theater to the City of New York.

The City leases the theater to Lincoln Center for the Performing Arts, Inc., which subleases it to City Center of Music and Drama, Inc. (CCMD). The present corporation of CCMD (originally affiliated with New York City Center on 55th Street, but now a separate entity) continues to manage the theater today.

Along with the opera and ballet companies, another early tenant of the theater was the now defunct Music Theater of Lincoln Center whose president was composer Richard Rodgers.  In the mid 1960s, the company produced fully staged revivals of classic Broadway musicals. These included The King and I; Carousel (with original star, John Raitt); Annie Get Your Gun (revised in 1966 by Irving Berlin for its original star, Ethel Merman); Show Boat; and South Pacific.

In July 2008, oil-and-gas billionaire David H. Koch pledged to provide $100 million over the next ten years to renovate the theater and provide an operating and maintenance endowment.  The facility became the David H. Koch Theater at the New York City Ballet Winter gala, November 25 of that year.  The theater is to bear his name for at least fifty years, after which it may be renamed; the Koch family retains the right of first refusal for any renaming.  Some people continue to refer to the theater by its original name.

Building features and renovation

The theater seats 2,586 and features broad seating on the orchestra level, four main “Rings” (balconies) and a small Fifth Ring, faced with jewel-like lights and a large spherical chandelier in the center of the gold latticed ceiling.

JCJ Architecture of New York City designed renovations with Schuler Shook as theater consultants.  In patron areas, the plan replaced and reconfigured all seats and carpeting.  The reconfiguration created two aisles in the orchestra level, which previously featured continental-style seating, with no center aisles.  It also upgraded restrooms to make them ADA compliant.  Work backstage included a new stage lighting system, expansion of the orchestra pit, and a mechanical lift in the pit floor allowing it to be raised to stage level when needed.

The lobby areas of the theater feature many works of modern art, including pieces by Jasper Johns, Lee Bontecou and Reuben Nakian.

Gallery

References

External links

Lincoln Center press release, July 9, 2008
David H. Koch Theater website 
New York City Ballet website 
JCJ Architecture, architects for 2009 renovation.
New York City Opera press release, undated 
New York Times article by Robin Pogrebin, July 10, 2008

Ballet venues
Dance venues in the United States
Theater, David H. Koch
Lincoln Center
Modernist architecture in New York City
Music venues completed in 1964
Opera houses in New York City
Philip Johnson buildings
Postmodern architecture in New York City
Theatres completed in 1964